Stephen Rhys Browne (born 16 November 1995) is an Antiguan footballer who plays for  club Woking. Able to play as a winger or striker, he has been capped by the Antigua and Barbuda national football team.

A former youth-team player at Norwich City and Charlton Athletic, he also spent time on loan at Isthmian League side VCD Athletic. He won the FA Youth Cup and Norfolk Senior Cup with Norwich, but did not play a first-team game for the "Canaries". He spent the 2015–16 season with Aldershot Town in the National League, before winning a move into the English Football League with Grimsby Town in June 2016. From Grimsby he was loaned out to Macclesfield Town, and played on the losing side in the 2017 FA Trophy final. He joined Yeovil Town in June 2017, before departing following the club's relegation out of the Football League at the end of the 2018–19 season. He remained in the Football League however, signing with Port Vale in July 2019. He left the club in August 2020 and joined Sutton United via Wealdstone in January 2021. Sutton went on to win promotion as National League champions at the end of the 2020–21 season. He rejoined Wealdstone in June 2021 and was sold on to Woking in October 2022.

Club career

Early career
Browne joined Norwich City as a youth player, having previously played for Interwood. He was part of the squad that won the 2012–13 FA Youth Cup with 4–2 aggregate victory over Chelsea, as well as the Norfolk Senior Cup that same season with a 2–0 win over Wroxham. He never made the senior team at Carrow Road however and was released by Norwich at the end of the 2013–14 season, subsequently joining Charlton Athletic. From Charlton he was loaned out to VCD Athletic of the Isthmian League. He left The Valley after being released by Charlton in May 2015.

Aldershot Town
Following his release from Charlton, Browne went on trial with National League club Aldershot Town. During his time on trial he scored in friendlies against Basingstoke Town and Chelsea under-21s, and impressed manager Barry Smith enough to win a contract on 31 July 2015. Browne made his competitive début and scored his first goal for the "Shots" in a 2–1 defeat to Gateshead at the Recreation Ground on 8 August. He went on to score seven goals in 41 appearances across the 2015–16 season as Aldershot posted a 15th-place finish.

Grimsby Town
On 21 June 2016, Browne signed a two-year contract with newly promoted League Two side Grimsby Town for an undisclosed fee. He made his debut for the "Mariners" in the EFL Cup, coming on as a 55th-minute substitute for Sean McAllister in a 1–0 defeat at Derby County. He made a further seven appearances for the club, all as a substitute, and new manager Marcus Bignot revealed that he was working to get the young striker a loan move closer to his family home after time spent on compassionate leave following the death of his father. On 12 January, he joined National League side Macclesfield Town on loan until the end of the 2016–17 season. He scored his first goal in his first league start for the "Silkmen", in a 1–0 win at Eastleigh on 21 February. He scored four goals in six games of the club's FA Trophy run, including one in the final at Wembley Stadium, though Macclesfield would lose the game 3–2 to York City. In all he scored six goals in 24 games during his time at Moss Rose.

Yeovil Town
On 16 June 2017, Browne left Grimsby for Yeovil Town, signing a two-year contract for an undisclosed fee. He stated that the "Glovers" aim was to achieve automatic promotion, though admitted that "I've never really played in this league before so I don't really know what the test is". On 30 January, he scored past former club Grimsby in a 3–0 win at Huish Park. He ended the 2017–18 campaign with six goals in 42 games as Darren Way's Yeovil posted a 19th-place finish. Having contributed just one goal from 30 appearances in the 2018–19 season and missing the end of season run-in with a hamstring injury, Browne was released by Yeovil following the club's relegation from the Football League.

Port Vale
Browne signed for League Two side Port Vale on 27 July 2019, having been on trial at the club throughout pre season; he had previously played under manager John Askey at Macclesfield Town. A hamstring problem caused him to miss the first month of the 2019–20 season, and he eventually made his debut for the "Valiants" on 14 September, replacing Callum Evans 35 minutes into a 1–0 win over Plymouth Argyle at Vale Park; ironically Evans was taken off due to a hamstring injury, as was winger David Amoo, leaving Browne with an opportunity to stake a first-team place in their absence. He scored his first goal for the club in an EFL Trophy tie against Mansfield Town on 3 December. After the game Askey commented that Browne "has a tendency to be lazy" but "has got a lot of ability [and] if he is confident then he can play at a high level". Speaking in February, first-team coach Danny Pugh said that "he has done exceptionally well in the last couple of games... [though] it has been a frustrating season [for him and] maybe he has not played as much as he would have liked". He signed a new one-year contract after he ended the campaign with one goals in 15 appearances. On 29 August 2020, Browne left Port Vale having had his contract terminated at his request. Askey cited family reasons for the player's departure, adding that "it was a shame because he was doing well".

Non-League
On 23 December 2020, Browne signed for National League side Wealdstone. He made only one brief appearance for the "Stones", in a 4–0 defeat at Maidenhead United on Boxing day. On 6 January 2021, Browne signed for fellow National League side Sutton United. He made 14 appearances in the second half of the 2020–21 season, as Sutton secured promotion into the Football League as champions of the National League. However he was one of seven players released in the summer by manager Matt Gray. Browne returned to Wealdstone in June 2021, signing a one year contract with an option for a second year. On 13 November 2021, Browne scored his first goal for the Stones, coming off the bench and scoring the only goal in a 1–0 victory over rivals Barnet at Grosvenor Vale. In March 2022, Browne scored three goals in two games, with a goal away to Maidenhead United and a brace in a 3–2 win over Weymouth. He ended the 2021–22 season with six goals in 29 games.

On 14 October 2022, Browne joined league rivals Woking for an undisclosed fee, having scored seven goals in thirteen league games in the early part of Wealdstone's season.

International career
Browne made his international début for Antigua and Barbuda at the Sir Vivian Richards Stadium on 10 June 2015, coming on as a 66th-minute substitute for Keiran Murtagh in a 4–1 defeat to Saint Lucia in the second round of 2018 FIFA World Cup CONCACAF qualification. His second cap and first international start came in the second leg, where he was substituted in the 46th-minute in a 4–1 win; Antigua won 5–4 on aggregate, and advanced to the third round. He scored his first international goal on 21 March 2018, opening the scoring in a 3–2 friendly win over Bermuda.

Style of play
On signing for Aldershot Town, manager Barry Smith said; "Rhys fulfils everything that we're looking for in a wide player – he's quick, he's got a trick, he's enthusiastic and has had a good upbringing in football. When you see someone as exciting as Rhys you want to have these type of players in your squad". Yeovil manager Darren Way commented that "Rhys is technically a very, very gifted player and someone I've been aware of for the last two years. He likes to get the ball to feet, be positive in one-on-one situations and he's got a good end product in the final third".

Personal life
Browne is the son of former Yeovil Town footballer Steve Browne.

Career statistics

Club

International

As of match played 8 June 2021. Antigua & Barbuda score listed first, score column indicates score after each Browne goal.

Honours
Norwich City Youth
FA Youth Cup: 2012–13
Norfolk Senior Cup: 2013

Macclesfield Town
FA Trophy runner-up: 2016–17

Sutton United
National League: 2020–21

References

External links

1995 births
Living people
Footballers from Romford
English footballers
Antigua and Barbuda footballers
Antigua and Barbuda international footballers
English sportspeople of Antigua and Barbuda descent
Black British sportsmen
Association football wingers
Association football forwards
Norwich City F.C. players
Charlton Athletic F.C. players
VCD Athletic F.C. players
Aldershot Town F.C. players
Grimsby Town F.C. players
Macclesfield Town F.C. players
Yeovil Town F.C. players
Port Vale F.C. players
Wealdstone F.C. players
Sutton United F.C. players
Woking F.C. players
Isthmian League players
National League (English football) players
English Football League players